Burrows is an unincorporated community in Saskatchewan.

Unincorporated communities in Saskatchewan
Willowdale No. 153, Saskatchewan
Division No. 5, Saskatchewan